The canton of Chartres-Sud-Est is a former French administrative division located in the département of Eure-et-Loir in the région of Centre-Val de Loire. It had 23,692 inhabitants (2012).

History 
The canton was created in 1973, at the same time as the cantons of Chartres-Sud-Ouest, Chartres-Nord-Est and Chartres-Nord-Ouest. It was abolished by the decree of 24 February 2014 (effective from 29 March 2015) which incorporated its constituent parts into the newly-created Canton of Chartres-2.

Composition 
The canton comprised the following communes:
Berchères-les-Pierres 
Chartres (partly)
Le Coudray
Gellainville
Nogent-le-Phaye
Prunay-le-Gillon
Sours

See also 
 Cantons of the Eure-et-Loir department

References 

Chartres-Sud-Est
Chartres